Francisco Meneghini Correa (born 13 August 1988) is an Argentine football manager, currently in charge of Chilean club Everton de Viña del Mar.

References

External links

1988 births
Living people
Argentine football managers
Unión La Calera managers
Audax Italiano managers
Chilean Primera División managers
Everton de Viña del Mar managers
Expatriate football managers in Chile
Argentine expatriate sportspeople in Chile